This is a list of settlements in the Magnesia regional unit, Greece.

 Achilleio
 Aerino
 Afetes
 Agia Triada
 Agioi Theodoroi
 Agios Dimitrios Piliou
 Agios Georgios Feron
 Agios Georgios Nileias
 Agios Ioannis, in Almyros municipality
Agios Ioannis, Pelion
 Agios Lavrentios
 Agios Onoufrios
 Agios Vlasios
 Agria
 Aidini
 Alli Meria
 Almyros
 Amaliapoli
 Anakasia
 Anavra
 Anilio
 Ano Lechonia
 Ano Volos
 Anthotopos
 Argalasti
 Dimini
 Drakeia
 Drymonas
 Efxeinoupoli
 Glafyra
 Kala Nera
 Kalamaki
 Kanalia
 Kato Lechonia
 Katochori
 Keramidi
 Kerasia
 Kissos
 Kofoi
 Kokkotoi
 Kroki
 Lafkos
 Lampinou
 Makrinitsa
 Makryrrachi
 Metochi
 Mikro Perivolaki
 Mikrothives
 Milies
 Milina
 Mouresi
 Nea Anchialos
 Nea Ionia
 Neochori
 Perivlepto
 Fylaki
 Pinakates
 Platanos
 Portaria
 Pouri
 Promyri
 Pteleos
 Rizomylos
 Sesklo
 Sourpi
 Stagiates
 Stefanovikeio
 Syki
 Trikeri
 Tsagkarada
 Velestino
 Volos
 Vrynaina
 Vyzitsa
 Xinovrysi
 Xorychti 
 Zagora

By municipality

See also
List of towns and villages of Greece

 
Magnesia